The mayor of Kaipara officiates over the Kaipara District of New Zealand's North Island. The current mayor is Craig Jepson.

History
Kaipara District was formed through the 1989 New Zealand local government reforms.

Graeme Ramsey was Mayor from 1998 to 2004.

In 2012, the district council was sacked by the government and replaced with commissioners over a proposed 31 per cent increase in rates to cover the costs of the Mangawhai Community Wastewater Scheme. Some component of local democracy was restored for the 2016 local elections and full self-management was granted from the 2019 local elections onwards.

Greg Gent was elected Mayor during the 8 October 2016 local elections. He took office in November 2016 but resigned suddenly after one year and one day effective November 2017. The Deputy Mayor, Peter Wethey, became Acting Mayor after Gent's departure and before the resulting by-election. Sheep and beef farmer Jason Smith was elected Mayor following a by-election in February 2018. He declined to stand for re-election during the 2022 local elections. 

During the 2022 local elections, Craig Jepson was elected as Mayor of Kaipara. Jepson stood on the Democracy Northland ticket and campaigned on fixing roads, infrastructural investment, and opposing the Government's Three Waters reform programme and co-governance policies such as the Māori wards and constituencies. In late October, Jepson appointed councillor Jonathan Larsen as Deputy Mayor. In late November 2022, Jepson attracted media attention after interrupting Māori ward councillor Pera Paniora's karakia (Māori prayer). He subsequently banned karakia from council meetings on the grounds that specific religions or cultures should not be included in secular meetings.

List of officeholders
The following table is a complete list of the mayors of Kaipara since the district's formation in 1989.

References

Kaipara
 Kaipara
Kaipara District